Sha or Shu (Ш ш; italics: Ш ш) is a letter of the Glagolitic and Cyrillic scripts. It commonly represents the voiceless postalveolar fricative . More precisely, the sound in Russian denoted by ш is commonly transcribed as a palatoalveolar fricative but is actually a voiceless retroflex fricative. It is used in every variation of the Cyrillic alphabet for Slavic and non-Slavic languages. 

In English, Sha is romanized as sh or as š, the latter being the equivalent letter in the Latin alphabets of Czech, Slovak, Slovene, Serbo-Croatian, Macedonian, Latvian and Lithuanian.

History
Sha has its earliest origins in Phoenician Shin and is possibly linked closely to Shin's Greek equivalent: Sigma (Σ, σ, ς). (The similar form of the modern Hebrew Shin (ש), which is probably where the Cyrillic letter was actually derived from,  derives from the same Proto-Canaanite source). Sha already possessed its current form in Saints Cyril and Methodius's Glagolitic alphabet. Most Cyrillic letter-forms were derived from the Greek, but as there was no Greek sign for the Sha sound (modern Greek uses simply "Σ/σ/ς" to spell the sh-sound in foreign words and names), Glagolitic Sha was adopted unchanged. There is also a possibility that Sha was taken from the Coptic alphabet, which is the same as the Greek alphabet but with a few letters added at the end, including one called "shai" (Ϣϣ) which somewhat resembles both sha and shcha (Щ, щ) in appearance.

Use in mathematics
The Cyrillic letter Ш is internationally used in mathematics for several concepts:

In algebraic geometry, the Tate–Shafarevich group of an Abelian variety A over a field K is denoted Ш(A/K), a notation first suggested by J. W. S. Cassels.  (Previously it had been denoted TS.) Presumably the choice comes from the first letter of Шафаре́вич = Shafarevich.

In a different mathematical context, some authors allude to the shape of the letter Sha when they use the term Shah function for what is otherwise called a Dirac comb.

The shuffle product is often denoted by ш.

Related letters
ش : Arabic letter Shin/Sin
Ⱎ : Glagolitic letter Sha/ša
Ⱋ : Glagolitic letter Shta/šta or Shcha/šča
Щ щ : Cyrillic letter Shcha
⧢ : Shuffle product
Ʃ ʃ : Latin letter Esh
Š š : Latin letter S with caron
Ŝ ŝ : Latin letter S with circumflex
Ş ş : Latin letter S with cedilla
Ș ș : Latin letter S with comma below

Computing codes

References

External links